Lawrence Bernard "Larry" Singleton (July 28, 1927 – December 28, 2001), nicknamed the "Mad Chopper" in media accounts, was an American criminal known for perpetrating an infamous rape and mutilation of adolescent hitchhiker Mary Vincent in California in 1978, and then perpetrating a second attack on a woman shortly after being released from prison eight years later. He raped Mary and cut off her arms, then left her to die in a culvert off of Interstate 5 in Del Puerto Canyon. Mary managed to hike to safety and later acted as a key witness against the rapist. Released from prison on good behavior after serving eight years of his fourteen-year sentence, Singleton later murdered Roxanne Hayes, a mother of three. On February 19, 1997, police found him covered in blood after stabbing her in his new home.

Biography
Lawrence Singleton was born in Tampa, Florida. He worked as a merchant seaman.

First conviction 
On September 29, 1978, Singleton picked up 15-year-old Mary Vincent of Las Vegas, Nevada, while she was hitchhiking from her grandfather's house in Berkeley, California back home to Las Vegas. He picked her up outside of Modesto, California, after which he knocked her unconscious with a sledgehammer, spent the whole night raping her, and tortured her by severing both her forearms with a hatchet. Singleton figured she was dead or near death and he threw her off of a 30-foot cliff on Interstate-5 near Del Puerto Canyon, leaving her naked and bleeding out. She mitigated the bleeding from her forearms by shoving them into mud, and the mud suppressed her bleeding while she managed to pull herself back up the cliff. She walked for three miles, naked, covered in blood, and armless, before finding and alerting a passing couple, who took her to a hospital. By the time of Singleton's arrest, Vincent wore prosthetic arms.

Six months after the assault, Vincent faced Singleton at his trial, where her testimony helped to convict him. Singleton was sentenced to fourteen years in prison, the maximum allowed by law in California at that time. The presiding judge remarked: "If I had the power, I would send him to prison for the rest of his natural life."

While Vincent won a $2.56 million civil judgment against Singleton, she was unable to collect it when Singleton revealed that he was unemployed, in poor health, and had only $200 in savings.

Along with the particularly gruesome and callous aspects of the crime, the case became even more notorious after Singleton was paroled after serving only eight years in prison. He was able to reduce his time through good behavior and working as a teaching assistant in a prison classroom. Singleton was paroled to Contra Costa County, California, but no town would accept his presence, so he had to live in a trailer on the grounds of San Quentin prison until his parole ended a year later.

According to Time magazine, "as authorities attempted to settle him in one Bay Area town after another, angry crowds and Tampa's chapter of Guardian Angels led protests, screamed, picketed and eventually prevailed." In Rodeo, about 25 miles northeast of San Francisco, a crowd of approximately 500 local protestors forced officers to move him under armed guard from a hotel room. Authorities tried housing him across the street from Concord's City Hall, but that was met with protests and failed too.  He was removed from one apartment in Contra Costa County in a bullet-proof vest after 400 residents surrounded the building to protest a decision to place him there permanently. Governor George Deukmejian ordered that Singleton be placed in a trailer on the grounds of San Quentin for the duration of his one-year parole.

The outrage at this sentence resulted in legislation, supported by Mary Vincent, which prevents the early release of offenders who have committed a crime in which torture is used: in 1987 Singleton's parole led to passage of California's "Singleton bill", which carries a 25-years-to-life sentence. (Harrower, 1998). The leniency of the legal system shocked and outraged many. One journalist who interviewed him remarked, "What was most surprising to me, however, was not his sentence. It was that Larry Singleton had worked his crimes around in his mind so completely that they did not warrant punishment at all." Right before Singleton's parole ended, Donald Stahl, the Stanislaus County prosecutor at Singleton's trial, said, "I think, if anything, he's worse now. He has not taken responsibility. He lives in a bizarre fantasy land and acquits himself each day. He doesn't accept his guilt and won't resolve never to do it again."

Move to Florida
Singleton returned to his native Florida after his release. In 1990, he was twice convicted of theft. He served a 60-day sentence for stealing a $10 disposable camera in spring 1990 and in the winter received a two-year prison term for stealing a $3 hat. Before his sentencing for the latter crime, he described himself to the judge as "a confused, muddleheaded old man".

In the spring of 1997, a neighbor called police to report Singleton assaulting a woman in his home in Sulphur Springs, Florida. When police responded, they found the dead body of Roxanne Hayes; she had been stabbed multiple times in the upper body. Hayes was a mother of three.

Mary Vincent traveled from California to Tampa to appear at Singleton's sentencing. During her testimony, she described Singleton's attack and the toll the ordeal had taken on her. The judge sentenced Singleton to death. Singleton died in 2001 of cancer in a prison hospital at the North Florida Reception Center in Starke, Florida.

References

1927 births
2001 deaths
20th-century American criminals
American kidnappers
American male criminals
American people convicted of attempted murder
American people convicted of murder
American people convicted of theft
American people who died in prison custody
American prisoners sentenced to death
American rapists
Crimes against sex workers in the United States
Criminals of the San Francisco Bay Area
Deaths from cancer in Florida
People convicted of murder by Florida
Prisoners and detainees of California
Prisoners sentenced to death by Florida
Prisoners who died in Florida detention